The 2020 Northwest Territories Women's Curling Championship, the women's provincial curling championship for the Northwest Territories, was held from January 9 to 12 at the Hay River Curling Club in Hay River, Northwest Territories. The winning Kerry Galusha rink represented the Northwest Territories at the 2020 Scotties Tournament of Hearts in Moose Jaw, Saskatchewan and finished with a 2–5 record.

Kerry Galusha and her team went undefeated through the tournament to claim the title with a perfect 4–0 round robin record and a 9–3 win over club mates Sarah Stroeder in the final.

Teams
The teams are listed as follows:

Round-robin standings
Final round-robin standings

Round-robin results
All draws are listed in Mountain Standard Time (UTC−07:00).

Draw 1
Thursday, January 9, 3:30 pm

Draw 2
Thursday, January 9, 8:00 pm

Draw 3
Friday, January 10, 10:00 am

Draw 4
Friday, January 10, 3:00 pm

Draw 5
Saturday, January 11, 9:00 am

Playoffs

Semifinal
Saturday, January 11, 7:30 pm

Final
Sunday, January 12, 2:00 pm

References

Northwest Territories
January 2020 sports events in Canada
South Slave Region
Curling in the Northwest Territories
2020 in the Northwest Territories